Mary L. Russ (born c. 1953 in Tampa, Florida) is a retired jockey in Thoroughbred horse racing who was the first female rider in North America to win a Grade 1 race, the first to earn more than $1 million in purses in a season, and the first to win a major race meet. She was inducted into the Calder Race Course Hall of Fame in 2003. While still an apprentice, on February 28, 1982, Mary Russ became the first female jockey to win a Grade 1 race when she captured the 1982 edition of the Widener Handicap aboard Lord Darnley, trained by Roger Laurin, at Hialeah Park in Florida. That same year, aboard Majestic Cat, she won the 1982 New York City Big Apple OTB Handicap and the Albany Stakes, two of the three races that would comprise the Big Apple Triple.

She is married to Rick Tortora, son of trainer Manny Tortora.

Reference

1950s births
Living people
American jockeys
American female jockeys
Sportspeople from Tampa, Florida